is a Japanese rock band from Kobe formed in 2009. The band is signed to A-Sketch Music Label and has, as of 2015, released 4 EPs and multiple singles. In 2015, Frederic won the Kansai block local award at the 7th CD Shop Awards for their album oddloop. This album was released on September 24, 2014 and was also their debut at a major record label.

Members
Frederic currently consists of:
  – Vocals, guitar (b.1990)
  – Bass guitar, vocals (b.1990)
  – Guitar (b.1989)
  - Drums (b.1989)

Kenji and Koji are twin brothers. Kenji and Ryuji graduated from same vocational school, ESP Osaka

Former members:
 kaz. – Drums

Discography

Albums

Extended plays

Singles

References

External links

Frederic Discography
Frederic Discography at A-Sketch Music Label

Japanese rock music groups
Musical quartets
Musical groups established in 2009
Musical groups from Hyōgo Prefecture
2009 establishments in Japan